Ghislain Deslandes is a French philosopher born in Angers (France) on the 16th of August 1970.

His interdisciplinary discourse spans such topics as Media management, Leadership studies and Postmodern theology.

He is a full professor at ESCP Business School and a former program director at the Collège International de Philosophie (CIPh). 

He received the EFMD-FNEGE Best Essay Award in 2015 and the first ESCP Research award in 2019.

Academic and professional positions 

At ESCP Business School Europe, he is a member of the Law, Economics and Humanities department and he is best known as the academic director of the advanced Media Management program since 1997, a pioneer in Europe in the domain of media economics and media management created ten years before. With the help of a sponsoring committee made up of professionals such as Jean Drucker, Jacques Rigaud and Daniel Toscan du Plantier, the pedagogical content has focused on editorial transformations and economic changes in both new and traditional media.

Before entering academia, he has occupied various senior positions in the media and digital industries from 1994 until 2007, when he transferred a news publishing company that he had run four years. He is now an editorial board member of Business and Professional Ethics Journal (BPEJ), of International Journal on Media Management (JMM), of Journal of Media Business Studies, and a regular contributor to Xerfi Canal.

He is also a Board Member of the Société des Amis de Port-Royal.

Research work

Media management 

His research has contributed to the consolidation of a European orientation, especially through his involvement in the activities of EMMA, to media organization studies. His initial work presents media management less as a new academic discipline than as a multi-paradigm field of research that challenges the universalist approaches to management science. Hence his special interest for the place of ethics, CSR and organizational identity in managing media companies and entertainment businesses.

Philosophy of management 

Drawing on various sources of continental philosophy his work highlights the fact that ethics in business cannot be taught or understood as any other management "knowledge".
In the Ancient Greece, the "oikonomos" was not only dedicated to take advantage of existing assets but also to master his/her self and to care for the society as a whole.

At the Collège international de philosophie, he developed a research program which aimed to extend the efforts made by critical and phenomenological researchers in order to discuss the commonly-held epistemic and political aspects of modern management. The program emphasized "the crisis of the foundations faced by management science in its ethical/philosophical aims", a crisis that can be defined as desaffectio societatis, and which seems to affect managers more and more.

Leadership studies 

From an interpretation of Blaise Pascal and Paul Ricoeur’s analysis of power, he suggests new concepts to discuss the question of leadership responsibility, rethinking the usual way of considering it : practical wisdom, skeptical humanism or "double thought". It leads him to show that power cannot be separated from a dialectic of abilities and disabilities; this approach is at the root of several contributions about the strategic "vision" and gender issues using the works of Henri Bergson and Gilles Deleuze, and about the beau geste as a critical behavior in organizations.

Continental philosophy of religion 

In this field, he applies the notion of antiphilosophy as defined by Alain Badiou to a comparative philosophical analysis of Kierkegaard and Pascal. He examines the unique position occupied by these two authors that he defines as an antiphilosophy of christianity in light of their idiosyncratic understanding of the relationship between faith and philosophical doubt. He also explores the connections between this position and more recent currents of thought, with particular reference to John Caputo, Gianni Vattimo and Michel Henry. This perspective is also largely discussed in his essay focusing on the idea of "beginning" in Lequier's philosophy

Bibliography

Books 

 The Idea of Beginning in Jules Lequier's Philosophy, Rowman & Littlefield, 2023.
 Antiphilosophy of Christianity, Springer, 2021.
 Court traité sur la recherche d'une première vérité, Editions Ovadia, Nice•Paris•Bruxelles•Montréal, 2020.
 A propos du management et d'un problème plus général, Presses Universitaires de France, Paris, 2020.
 Critique de la condition managériale, Presses Universitaires de France, Paris, 2016.
 Essai sur les données philosophiques du management, Presses Universitaires de France, Paris, 2013.
 Le management des médias, Collection Repères, Editions La Découverte, Paris, 2008.

Academic publications (selection) 

 Branching-off in the Anthropocene era, Organization Studies (journal), 2021.
 Understanding the Human in Stakeholder Theory: a Phenomenological Approach to Affect-based Theory, Management Learning, with M. Painter and M. Perezts, 2020.
 Formal and Informal Benevolence in a Profit-Oriented Context, Journal of Business Ethics, with G. Mercier, 2019. 
 European Management Teaching and Research: Reflections on the Life and Work of A. Blanqui, European Management Journal, 2019.
 Escape from freedom: Revisiting Erich Fromm in the light of Contemporary Authoritarianism, Organization Studies (journal), 2018
 Talent Management: The Good, the Bad, and the Possible, European Management Review, with M. Painter-Morland, S. Kirk and C. Tansley, 2018.
 Weak Theology and Organization Studies, Organization Studies (journal), 2018.
 Authentic Leading as Relational Accountability: Facing up to the Conflicting Expectations of Media Leaders, Leadership (journal), with M. Painter-Morland, 2017.
 The Leader as Chief Truth Officer, Journal of Business Ethics, with J. P. Bouilloud and G. Mercier, 2017.
 Reconceptualizing CSR in the Media Industry as Relational Accountability, Journal of Business Ethics, with M. Painter-Morland, 2016.
 There are no Codes, Only Interpretations. Practical Wisdom and Hermeneutics in Monastic Organizations, Journal of Business Ethics, with G. Mercier, 2016.
 The dynamics of Organizational Identity from a Ricoeurian Perspective, Journal for Communication and Culture, 2015.
 The Aesthetics of Leadership: Beau Geste as Critical Behaviour, Organization Studies (journal), with J. P. Bouilloud, 2015.
 Gender and Visionary Leading: rethinking "Vision" with Bergson, Deleuze and Guattari, Organization, with M. Painter-Morland, 2014.
 Power, Profits, and Practical Wisdom: Ricoeur's perspectives on the Possibility of an Ethics in Institutions, Business and Professional Ethics Journal, 2012.
 The Care-of-Self Ethic with Continual Reference to Socrates: Towards Ethical Self-Management, Business Ethics: A European Review, 2012.
 Turkish auteur cinema and European identity: Economic influences on aesthetic issues, Journal of European Popular Culture, with J. Maixent, 2012.
 Corporate Culture versus Organizational Identity: Implications for Media Management, Journal of Media Business Studies, 2011.
 In Search of Individual Responsibility: The Dark Side of Organizations in the Light of Jansenist Ethics, Journal of Business Ethics, 2011.
 Indirect Communication and Business Ethics: Kierkegaardian Perspectives, Business and Professional Ethics Journal, 2011.

External links 

 Biographical information, ESCP website. 
 "Wittgenstein and the Practical Turn in Business Ethics", Electronic Journal of Business Ethics and Organizational Studies, 16(1), pp 48–56.

References 

1970 births
Living people
French philosophers
21st-century French philosophers
Continental philosophers
Kierkegaard scholars
People from Angers
Phenomenologists
Philosophers of culture
Philosophers of religion
Philosophy academics
Philosophy writers